Carolay is an independent nationally produced youth television series starring Carolay Santos in Maracaibo, Venezuela, in production with Oduver Cubillan and co-produced by BGCreativos. It premiered between October 26, 2019 and January 12, 2020 on Venevisión. A second season was confirmed. Carolay's producer stated that his dream was to have a series broadcast by Venevisión.

It is the first Venezuelan youth series to be produced and recorded exclusively in the state of Zulia.

Synopsis 
Carolay is not an ordinary girl as everyone may believe, she is the daughter of prosapia (human) parents, but one day she will discover a great truth and understand why she is different from prosapia society. She discovers that she is the daughter of a magical king, called Mr. Very Good, an inhabitant of the sweet planet and for this reason she is heir to the royal throne. But this is not as easy as you imagine, Carolay is doomed to die at the hands of the Bitter Witch.

Cast of actors 

 Dora Mazzone
 Simón Pestana
 Antonio Delli
 Hilda Abrahamz
 Tania Sarabia
 Diana Patricia Cubillan
 Ángel Atencio
 Caterine Baker
 Samer Kotteich
 Esteban Novaro
 María Manuela Corzo
 Enzo Pradelli
 Surena
 Alejandra Flores
 Leonel Soto
 Gabriel Valdivieso
 Sandy Miranda
 Dianela Parra
 Victoria Saracino
 Megan Al Abdala
 Nerio Cuadrado
 Alfredo Suárez
 Bárbara Serpente
 Fabiana Rutigliano
 Giovanna Picazza
 Rey Raggio
 Iceberg Méndez
 Valeria Fernández
 Vanessa Cassiani
 Paula Moreno
 Kariana
 Norayda Reyes
 Arianni Villalobos
 Douglas Castro
 Katherin Vielma

References 

Venevisión telenovelas
Venezuelan telenovelas
Spanish-language telenovelas
2010s Venezuelan television series
Television series about teenagers
2010 Venezuelan television series debuts
2010 Venezuelan television series endings